Petrovske is a city in Krasnyi Luch Municipality, Luhansk Oblast (region) of Ukraine. Population: , .

Since 2014, Petrovske has been controlled by the Luhansk People's Republic and not by Ukrainian authorities.

The Ukrainian government recognizes the city since 2016 as Petrovo-Krasnosillia.

Demographics 
Native language as of the Ukrainian Census of 2001:
Russian  76.4%
Ukrainian  22.4%
Belarusian  0.1%

References 

Cities in Luhansk Oblast
Yekaterinoslav Governorate
Cities of district significance in Ukraine
Populated places established in the Russian Empire
City name changes in Ukraine
Former Soviet toponymy in Ukraine